Vusumuzi Mazibuko (born 5 August 1984) is a South African first class cricketer. He was included in the North West cricket team squad for the 2015 Africa T20 Cup.

References

External links
 

1984 births
Living people
South African cricketers
North West cricketers
Cricketers from Johannesburg